Martensia martensii is a species of red algae.

References

Species described in 2001
Delesseriaceae